Hunter Robert George Poon (14 May 1894 – 25 January 1980) was the first player of Chinese descent to appear in Australian first-class cricket.

Biography
Hunter Robert George Poon was born near Ballina, New South Wales to a Cantonese man, William ("Lam") Poon, who had migrated to Australia to work on the north Queensland goldfields, and his half Chinese, half Anglo-Australian wife, Elizabeth (née Key). Hunter Poon's name appears on his birth certificate as Ander Leppit George Poon as the clerk registering his birth could not understand his father's accent. Poon moved with his family to Toowoomba, Queensland and was educated at Toowoomba Grammar School, becoming a school teacher after graduation. A right arm leg spin bowler and right-handed batsman, Poon became a leading cricketer around Toowoomba.

His career was interrupted by World War I, and Poon enlisted in the Australian Imperial Force on 5 September 1916, serving as a Lance Corporal with the 15th Battalion in France, where he was injured.

Returning from the war, with shrapnel wounds in his right hand and lower back, Poon continued to star in Toowoomba cricket and was chosen to represent Queensland in a first-class match against Victoria at the Melbourne Cricket Ground starting 21 December 1923. While Poon was unable to take a wicket and scored only 10 and two, his selection caused international headlines.

Although Poon never again played first-class cricket, he did play against the touring Marylebone Cricket Club twice. Representing Toowoomba, Poon played against MCC in December 1924, taking 0/19 and, batting at number four, scoring 11 and 0. In February 1933, during the Bodyline series, Poon represented Queensland Country against MCC in Toowoomba, taking 2/123 and 0/23 and scoring one with the bat. Poon took the Wickets of Herbert Sutcliffe, stumped by future Test wicket keeper Don Tallon, and Gubby Allen.

Poon died in Greenslopes, Brisbane in 1980, aged 85. The second cricketer of Chinese background to play first-class cricket in Australia, Richard Chee Quee, would not make his first-class debut until 1993.

See also
Richard Chee Quee

References

External links

1894 births
1980 deaths
Australian cricketers
Australian military personnel of World War I
Australian people of British descent
Australian people of Chinese descent
Cricketers from New South Wales
People from Toowoomba
Queensland cricketers